The symplast of a plant is the inner side of a cell membrane in which water and low-molecular-weight solutes can freely diffuse. Symplast cells have more than one nucleus. 
 
Symplast could also refer to the connection of the inner contents (cytoplasm) of neighbouring cells made by the microscopic channels that traverse the cell walls. 
These channels, which are called plasmodesmata, allow the direct flow of small molecules such as sugars, amino acids, and ions between cells (from the inner part of one cell to the inner partof the next cell).
Larger molecules, including transcription factors and plant viruses, can also be transported through with the help of actin structures.

This allows direct cytoplasm-to-cytoplasm flow of water and other nutrients along concentration gradients. 
In particular, symplastic flow is used in the root systems to bring in nutrients from soil. Nutrient solutes move in this way through three skin layers of the roots: from cells of the epidermis, the outermost layer, through the cortex into the endodermis. 

Once solutes reach the endodermal cells through apoplastic flow[clarification needed: from where do those solutes come??], they are forced into the symplastic pathway due to the presence of the Casparian strip. 
Once the solutes are passively filtered[clarification needed: by what are they filtered?], they eventually reach the pericycle, where they can be moved into the xylem for long-distance transport.
It is contrasted with the apoplastic flow, which means not crossing from one side of a membrane to its other side, but a flow inside the membrane/wall itself.

History
The symplastic transport was first realized by Eduard Tangl in 1879, who also discovered the plasmodesmata, a term coined by Eduard Strasburger, 1901. In 1880, Hanstein coined the term symplast. The contrasting terms apoplast and symplast were used together in 1930 by Münch.

References

See also
Apoplast
Plant sap
Polar auxin transport, a type of cell-to-cell transport 
Protoplast
Tonoplast

Plant anatomy